A softgel is an oral dosage form for medicine in the form of a specialized capsule. They consist of a gelatin based shell surrounding a liquid fill. Softgel shells are a combination of gelatin, water, opacifier and a plasticiser such as glycerin or sorbitol.

Softgels are produced in a process known as encapsulation using the Rotary Die Encapsulation process invented by Robert Pauli Scherer.  The encapsulation process has been described as a form/fill/seal process.  Two flat ribbons of shell material are manufactured on the machine and brought together on a twin set of rotating dies.  The dies contain recesses in the desired size and shape, which cut out the ribbons into a two-dimensional shape, and form a seal around the outside. At the same time a pump delivers a precise dose of fill material through a nozzle incorporated into a filling wedge whose tip sits between the two ribbons in between two die pockets at the point of cut out.  The wedge is heated to facilitate the sealing process.  The wedge injection causes the two flat ribbons to expand into the die pockets, giving rise to the three-dimensional finished product.  After encapsulation, the softgels are dried for two days to two weeks depending on the product.

Since the 1990s, manufacturers have been able to replace gelatin in the shell with other polymers based on, for example, starch and carrageenan.

Catalent Pharma Solutions is the current owner of the RPScherer technology.

See also
 Capsule
 Paintballs

References

Drug delivery devices
Dosage forms
Gelatin